The men's 200 metres at the 1962 European Athletics Championships was held in Belgrade, then Yugoslavia, at JNA Stadium on 14, 15, and 16 September 1962.

Medalists

Results

Final
16 September
Wind: 0.0 m/s

Semi-finals
15 September

Semi-final 1
Wind: -3.1 m/s

Semi-final 2
Wind: -3.1 m/s

Semi-final 3
Wind: -2.8 m/s

Heats
14 September

Heat 1
Wind: 1.9 m/s

Heat 2
Wind: 3.1 m/s

Heat 3
Wind: 5.8 m/s

Heat 4
Wind: 1.1 m/s

Heat 5
Wind: 0.9 m/s

Heat 6
Wind: 2.3 m/s

Participation
According to an unofficial count, 26 athletes from 15 countries participated in the event.

 (1)
 (2)
 (2)
 (2)
 (2)
 (1)
 (3)
 (1)
 (2)
 (1)
 (1)
 (1)
 (3)
 (3)
 (1)

References

200 metres
200 metres at the European Athletics Championships